The state anthem of the Georgian SSR was the regional anthem of Georgia between 1946 and 1990 when it was part of the Soviet Union.

Background
The music was composed by Otar Taktakishvili, and the words were written by Grigol Abashidze and Alexander Abasheli. All three stanzas (not including the refrain) in the original lyrics have references to Joseph Stalin, a native Georgian and leader of the Soviet Union at that time. These words were completely removed after Stalin's death as part of Nikita Khrushchev's de-Stalinization program. It is then replaced with new lyrics with no reference to Stalin itself.  The last line of the refrain on the original version (აყვავდი, ტურფა ქვეყანავ - ილხინე, ქართველთ მხარეო), which once existed on all refrains, was removed completely and replaced with also new lyrics.

It is one of three Soviet republic national anthems that does not mention the Russian people, the others being the anthem of the Estonian Soviet Socialist Republic and the anthem of the Karelo-Finnish Soviet Socialist Republic.

Lyrics

1956–1990 lyrics (de-Stalinist version)

1946–1956 lyrics (Original version)

Sheet music

Notes

See also 

 Flag of the Georgian Soviet Socialist Republic
 Coat of arms of the Georgian Soviet Socialist Republic

External links
 Instrumental recording in MP3 format (Full version)
 Instrumental recording in MP3 format (Short version)
 MIDI file
 Vocal recording in MP3 format
 Lyrics - nationalanthems.info
 Original version (1946)

Georgian SSR
National symbols of Georgia (country)
Music of Georgia (country)
Georgian Soviet Socialist Republic
Songs of Georgia (country)